The Roman Catholic Archdiocese of Cochabamaba is an archdiocese located in the city of Cochabamba in Bolivia.

History
 June 25, 1847: Established as Diocese of Cochabamaba from the Metropolitan Archdiocese of La Plata and Diocese of Santa Cruz de la Sierra
 July 30, 1975: Promoted as Metropolitan Archdiocese of Cochabamba

Bishops

Ordinaries (listed in reverse chronological order)
 Archbishops of Cochabamaba (Roman rite)
 Archbishop Oscar Omar Aparicio Céspedes (2014.09.24 - ...
 Archbishop Tito Solari Capellari, S.D.B. (1999.07.08 – 2014.09.24)
 Archbishop René Fernández Apaza (1988.04.16 – 1999.07.08)
 Archbishop Gennaro Maria Prata Vuolo, S.D.B. (1981.11.21 – 1987.09.19)
 Archbishop José Armando Gutiérrez Granier (1975.07.30 – 1980.07.21)
 Bishops of Cochabamaba (Roman rite) 
 Archbishop José Armando Gutiérrez Granier (1965.08.19 – 1975.07.30)
 Bishop Juan Tarsicio Senner, O.F.M. (1951.10.26 – 1965.08.19)
 Bishop Bertoldo Bühl, O.F.M. (Apostolic Administrator 1943 – 1951.10.26)
 Bishop Tomás Aspe, O.F.M. (1931.06.08 – 1942.11.21)
 Bishop Julio Garret (1924.11.13 – 1929.12.28), appointed Bishop of Oruro
 Bishop Luigi Francesco Pierini, O.F.M. (1918.02.20 – 1923.10.31), appointed Archbishop of La Plata o Charcas
 Bishop Giacinto Anaya (1897.08.18 – 1915.12.17)
 Bishop Francesco Maria Granado (1871.08.25 - 1885.09.25)
 Bishop Rafael Salinas (1857.13.19 - 1871.03.19)
 Bishop José María Yáñez de Montenegro (1848.04.14 - 1854.11.24)

Coadjutor bishops
Francesco Maria Granado (1870-1871)
Luis Aníbal Rodríguez Pardo (1956-1958), did not succeed to see; appointed Bishop of Santa Cruz de la Sierra
Tito Solari Capellari, S.D.B. (1998-1999)

Auxiliary bishops
Francesco Maria Granado (1868-1870), appointed Coadjutor here
Abel Costas Montaño (1968-1974) appointed Bishop of Tarija
Luis Sáinz Hinojosa, O.F.M. (1982-1987), appointed Archbishop of La Paz; as Archbishop (Personal Title), was Auxiliary Bishop here again, 2001-2012
Angel Gelmi Bertocchi (1985-2013)
Manuel Revollo Crespo, C.M.F. (1985-1993), appointed Coadjutor Bishop of Bolivia, Military
Robert Herman Flock Bever (2012-2016), appointed Bishop of San Ignacio de Velasco
Carlos Enrique Curiel Herrera, Sch. P. (2018-)
Juan Gómez (2018-)

Suffragan dioceses
Diocese of Oruro
Territorial Prelature of Aiquile

See also
Roman Catholicism in Bolivia

References

External links
 GCatholic.org
 Diocese website

Roman Catholic dioceses in Bolivia
Religious organizations established in 1847
Roman Catholic dioceses and prelatures established in the 19th century
Cochabamba Department
 
Cochabamba
1847 establishments in Bolivia